An aryl sulfotransferase is an enzyme that 
transfers a sulfate group from phenolic sulfate esters to a phenolic acceptor substrate.

3'-phosphoadenylyl sulfate + a phenol  adenosine 3',5'-bisphosphate + an aryl sulfate

Thus, the two substrates of this enzyme are 3'-phosphoadenylyl sulfate and phenol, whereas its two products are adenosine 3',5'-bisphosphate and aryl sulfate.

These enzymes are transferases, specifically the sulfotransferases, which transfer sulfur-containing groups.  The systematic name of this enzyme class is 3'-phosphoadenylyl-sulfate:phenol sulfotransferase. Other names in common use include phenol sulfotransferase, sulfokinase, 1-naphthol phenol sulfotransferase, 2-naphtholsulfotransferase, 4-nitrocatechol sulfokinase, arylsulfotransferase, dopamine sulfotransferase, p-nitrophenol sulfotransferase, phenol sulfokinase, ritodrine sulfotransferase, and PST.  This enzyme participates in sulfur metabolism.

Structural studies

References

Further reading 

 
 

EC 2.8.2
Enzymes of known structure